is a Japanese actor and voice actor, represented by Yoshimoto Creative Agency. In 2010, Sorihashi was placed in L.A.F.U., a new unit of sixteen members under the auspices of Yoshimoto Kogyo. The group debuted with Sorihashi as lead singer in April 2011. In 2016, L.A.F.U. was dissolved and since then Sorihashi has appeared mainly in stage plays.

Filmography

Television
Star Hime Sagashi Tarō (TV Tokyo, 2010–11)
Ja dekinai yume no 10-kakan (BS, 2012)
Mōsō no ōji-sama (2014)
Mono mane benishiroutagassen (Fuji Television)

Video games 
La Corda d'Oro (2012) as Junya Niwa
Geten no Hana (2013) as Louis de Almeida
Kiniro no Corda 3: AnotherSky (2014) as Mamoru Sorimachi
Geten no Hana: Yume akari (2014) as Louis de Almeida
Harukanaru Jikū no Naka de 6 (2015) as Journalist

Theater 
Debt Equity Swap (2009) as Shōhei
Bidō Roman Daikatsugeki 〜Hakkenden〜 (2010) as Ōsumi Inuyama
Makoto 〜tobidase shinsenkumi (2012) as Fujichi Saitō
Uorutā miti ni sayonara (2013) as Super Manta
Okujō Wandārando (2013)
Girls Rockettia (2013)
Abc ★ Akasaka bōizukyabarē (2013) as Tadaaki Dōsono
Arupusu ichimanjaku vol.1 (2013) 
L.A.F.Utheatrical performance vol.1 (2014)
Myūjikaru ai no uta o utaou (2014)
L.A.F.Utheatrical performance vol.2 (2014)
It's awful! (2014)
Closet ZERO (2014)
Arupusu ichimanjaku vol.2 (2014)
Harukanaru Jikū no Naka de 5 (2014)
Agaruta no niji (2015)
Hoshi no Koe (2015)
Samurai Warriors (2015) as Masamitsu Asai
Agaruta no hana (2015)
Eru sabotāju (2015)
La Corda d'Oro: BlueSky FirstStage (2015) as Shirou Egami
Jinbōchō tokubetsu kōen shujinkō wa dare? (2015) 
Harukanaru Jikū no Naka de 6 as Periodista
Butai Anjera (2016) as Karudan
RANPO chronicle Shinkirō kitan (2016) as Shuen
Heian shangurira! 〜Īna gokuraku, naku na uguisu, kyūchū Retsu-den〜 (2016) as Aki/Tei
Rōdoku geki kumo wa waki, hikari afurete (2016)
Butai gurafā 2 (2016) as Itami
ōkina niji no ato de 〜fudō shi kyōdai〜 (2016) as Daichi Fudō
Kyo Kara Maoh!: Maō bōsō-hen (2016) as Ken Murata
Bugbusters (2016) as Aoyagi
The Legend of Heroes: Trails of Cold Steel (2017) as Patrick T. Higharms
Dynasty Warriors (2017) as Gakushin
Myūjikaru sayonara sorushie (2017) as Henri de Toulouse-Lautrec
Black Dice (2017) as Kurokawa
Gensō kitan shirohebi-den (2017) as King Lin
Rōdoku geki in'yōshi (2017) 
Captain Tsubasa (2017) as Hikaru Matsuyama
Hansamu rakugo dai 9-dan (2017)

References

External links
 Official Blog 

1987 births
People from Kanagawa Prefecture
Living people
21st-century Japanese male actors